Francisco de Rivera y Pareja (1561 – October 8, 1637) was a Roman Catholic prelate who served as Bishop of Michoacán (1629–1637) and Bishop of Guadalajara (1618–1629).

Biography
Francisco de Rivera y Pareja was born in Alcalá de Henares, Spain and ordained a priest in the Order of Our Lady of Mercy in 1582. On January 29, 1618, he was appointed by the King of Spain and confirmed by Pope Paul V as Bishop of Guadalajara. On October 28, 1618, he was consecrated bishop by Juan Pérez de la Serna, Archbishop of Mexico. On September 17, 1629, he was appointed by the King of Spain and confirmed by Pope Urban VIII as Bishop of Michoacán. He served as Bishop of Michoacán until his death on October 8, 1637.

References

External links and additional sources
 (for Chronology of Bishops) 
 (for Chronology of Bishops) 
 (for Chronology of Bishops) 
 (for Chronology of Bishops) 

1561 births
1637 deaths
Bishops appointed by Pope Paul V
Bishops appointed by Pope Urban VIII
People from Alcalá de Henares
Mercedarian bishops